James William White (November 2, 1850 – April 24, 1916) was an American surgeon from Philadelphia. After participating in the Hassler expedition to the West Indies, he became a respected surgeon, teacher and author at the University of Pennsylvania Hospital, with which he was associated from 1874 to 1916.  He was John Rhea Barton Professor of Surgery at the University of Pennsylvania Hospital from 1900 to 1912 and professor emeritus until his death.

Biography

J. William White was born in Philadelphia, a son of Dr. James W. White and his wife Mary Ann McClaranan.  Dr. James W. White was for many years president of the Board of Charities and Correction, founder of the Maternity Hospital in Philadelphia, and first president of the S. S. White Dental Manufacturing Company.

After completing courses of study in the public schools and Friends' School, J. William White entered the Medical Department of the University of Pennsylvania, whence he was graduated Doctor of Medicine, class of 1871, receiving from the university the degree of Doctor of Philosophy the same year. Shortly after graduation he became a member of the staff gathered by Professor Louis Agassiz for the Hassler expedition to the West Indies, the Straits of Magellan and both coasts of South America. After his return to Philadelphia he began practice, became eminent as a surgeon, and during his entire after life was a teacher and writer in surgery. He joined the University of Pennsylvania Medical School in 1874.  His connection with the university as professor emeritus ended only with his death.

White was the author of the "Human Anatomy" (1875); American Text Book of Surgery (1896); Genito-Urinary Surgery (1897); and an editor of Annals of Surgery. He was a member of the American Surgical Association, the American Genito-Urinary Association, a fellow of the College of Physicians of Philadelphia, and a trustee of the University of Pennsylvania.

White was an avid sportsman. He was a member of the Rittenhouse, Corinthian Yacht, Philadelphia Country and The Franklin Inn Club of Philadelphia. He was also a member of the Reform, the Royal Automobile and the Kinsman clubs, all of London, and of the Swiss and American Alpine Club.  Once, in September 1880, he swam from Newport to the Narragansett Pier, Rhode Island, making ten miles in five hours and forty minutes in a cold rough sea.

He married, in Milford, Connecticut, on June 22, 1888, Miss Letitia Brown, who survived him.

During World War I, Dr. White served at the American Hospital in Paris, as part of a unit from the University of Pennsylvania Medical School. He also published A Primer of the War for Americans (1914), later enlarged and republished as A Textbook of the War for Americans (1915).

References

External links

1850 births
1916 deaths
Physicians from Philadelphia
American surgeons
University of Pennsylvania faculty
Perelman School of Medicine at the University of Pennsylvania alumni
Perelman School of Medicine at the University of Pennsylvania faculty